In literature, the competent man (or peak-human) is a stock character who exhibits a very wide range of abilities and knowledge, making him a form of polymath. While not the first to use such a character type, the heroes and heroines of Robert A. Heinlein's fiction (with Jubal Harshaw being a prime example) generally have a wide range of abilities, and one of Heinlein's characters, Lazarus Long, gives a wide summary of requirements:

The competent man, more often than not, is written without explaining how he achieved his wide range of skills and abilities. When such characters are young, there is often not much explanation as to how they acquired so many skills at an early age.

Examples
Examples of early modern competent heroes include the protagonists of George Bernard Shaw, like Henry Higgins in Pygmalion and Caesar in Caesar and Cleopatra, as well as the citizen soldiers in Rudyard Kipling's "The Army of a Dream".
 
Many non-superpowered comic book characters are written as hyper-competent characters due to the perception that they would simply be considered underpowered otherwise. Batman, for example, is typically depicted as a member of the Justice League of America alongside Superman, Wonder Woman, and Green Lantern, all of whom are superpowered while he lacks superhuman powers of any kind. As a result, despite his original depiction as a vigilante, modern depictions of Batman portray him as having achieved the peak-human possibility in things physical and intellectual. The same treatment has been applied to Lex Luthor, who has always been Superman's archenemy despite the former's total lack of superhuman powers.

See also
 Mary Sue
 Jack of all trades, master of none
 Polymath

References

Giftedness
Heroes